The 1994 Oceania Athletics Championships were held in Auckland, New Zealand, between February 23–26, 1994.

A total of 41 events were contested, 22 by men and 19 by women.

Medal summary
Medal winners were published.  Complete results can be found as compiled by Bob Snow from Athletics Papua New Guinea.

Men

Women

Medal table (unofficial)

Participation (unofficial)
The participation of athletes from 15 countries could be determined from the Pacific Islands Athletics Statistics publication.

 
 
 
 
 
 
 
 
 
 
 
 
/

References

Oceania Athletics Championships
International athletics competitions hosted by New Zealand
Oceanian Championships
Oceania Athletics Championships
Oceania Athletics Championships